Antepavilion is an art charity in London, known for its extensive legal battles with the Hackney London Borough Council over its various art exhibits. The charity holds an annual design competition, commissioning a temporary structure to be installed at a site on the Regent's Canal, and also funds "art-craft-architecture" research, stages artistic and political events, and manages artist studio spaces.

In 2021 the charity's site was raided by London police, who arrested staff and seized equipment. London police claimed that one of the commissioned works that year was similar in design to bamboo towers constructed by protest group Extinction Rebellion.

Competition winners

References

External links

Public art in London
Hackney, London